The 1995 Delaware Fightin' Blue Hens football team represented the University of Delaware as a member of the Mid-Atlantic Division of the Yankee Conference during the 1995 NCAA Division I-AA football season. Led by 30th-year head coach Tubby Raymond, the Fightin' Blue Hens compiled an overall record of 11–2 with a mark of 8–0 in conference play, winning the Yankee Conference title. Delaware advanced to the NCAA Division I-AA Football Championship playoffs, where the Fightin' Blue Hens beat  in the first round before for losing to McNeese State in the quarterfinals. The team played home games at Delaware Stadium in Newark, Delaware.

Schedule

Roster

References

Delaware
Delaware Fightin' Blue Hens football seasons
Yankee Conference football champion seasons
Delaware Fightin' Blue Hens football